Arjan van Dijk (born 17 January 1987) is a Dutch retired professional footballer who played as a goalkeeper.

Club career
Born in Utrecht, Van Dijk played for local sides Sporting '70 and Elinkwijk and joined the youth team of Excelsior in 2006, making his senior debut in March 2009 against TOP Oss. He moved to RKC in summer 2010 and won the 2010–11 Eerste Divisie title with them.

In summer 2015, van Dijk moved into amateur football with USV Hercules, only to quit football over a persistent rib injury in January 2016.

References

Honours
Eerste Divisie: 1
 2010–11

External links
 Voetbal International profile 

1987 births
Living people
Footballers from Utrecht (city)
Association football goalkeepers
Dutch footballers
USV Elinkwijk players
Excelsior Rotterdam players
RKC Waalwijk players
Eerste Divisie players
USV Hercules players